Platysmacheilus exiguus is a species of cyprinid endemic to China. P. exiguus is a subtropical freshwater benthopelagic fish Its homotypic synonym is Pseudogobio exiguus. Originally classified in 1932, its genus Platysmacheilus has been joined by the longibarbatus (1977), nudiventris (1977), and the zhenjiangenisis (2005).

References

Platysmacheilus
Fish described in 1932